Pravda is a village in the Osh Region of Kyrgyzstan. It is part of the Kara-Suu District. It lies on the left bank of the river Kurshab. Its population was in 6,136 in 2021.

Population

References 

Populated places in Osh Region